Scott Frandsen (born July 21, 1980, in Kelowna, British Columbia) is a Canadian rower of Danish and Swedish descent.

Biography
Born in Kelowna, British Columbia, he began rowing at age 16 at Brentwood College (High School), in British Columbia, Canada.

He rowed for four years at the University of California, Berkeley. His freshman boat in 1999, coached by Craig Amerkhanian finished second at the Intercollegiate Rowing Association championship, which serves as the national championship race for men's collegiate rowing in the United States. In 2000, 2001, and 2002, he was in the varsity eight man boat, which won the IRA championship each year.  In 2000 and 2001, his boats were undefeated and are considered by many as the fastest collegiate boats ever.

In 2003, he went to St Edmund Hall, Oxford, for graduate work.  There he rowed for the university in the Oxford Blue Boat against rivals Cambridge in The Boat Race. Despite their diminutive stature his Oxford crew won a dramatic race by the smallest ever recorded margin (one foot), and in so winning, they overturned the biggest weight deficit in the history of the contest.  They achieved this by over-rating and out-racing their heavier Cambridge counterparts on the outside of the long Surrey bend through the middle of the race. This took considerable guts and fortitude, and the attitude the crew exemplified in doing so was reflective of Frandsen's natural tenacity and stubbornness.  Commentators cite this tenacity as the main factor allowing the Oxford crew to upset the much bigger, more powerful and more experienced 2003 Cambridge boat.

Frandsen went on to row that summer with one of his Cambridge rivals from the 2003 Boat Race, Wayne Pommen, at the 2003 World Rowing Championships in Milan.  The Boat Race pairing took sixth place for Canada in a hotly contested final of the coxless pairs event.

The following year Frandsen pursued selection for the 2004 Athens Olympics. He won two gold medals on the 2004 World Cup circuit, both in the Men's Eight event (in Munich, Germany and in Lucerne, Switzerland).  At the 2004 Summer Olympics he was in the Canadian Men's Eight (M8+) which was the favourite for the event. His boat narrowly lost out to the Americans in the Heat, with both crews going under the previous World Record time.  Come the Final the Canadians had a disappointing row and finished out of the medals in fifth place.

In 2005, Frandsen was again in the Canadian Men's Eight.  This time, his boat finished seventh at the World Championships held in Gifu-Nagaragawa, Japan.  After a frustrating couple of years in the Canadian National Team system, at the 2008 Summer Olympics in Beijing, China Scott won a silver medal in the Men's coxless pairs with Dave Calder. It was Canada's first medal of the Games. Terry Paul coached them for the event.

He and David Calder teamed again at the 2012 Summer Olympics, finishing 6th in the final.

References

External links
 Profile at Rowing Canada

1980 births
Alumni of St Edmund Hall, Oxford
Canadian people of Danish descent
Canadian people of Swedish descent
Canadian male rowers
Living people
Medalists at the 2008 Summer Olympics
Olympic medalists in rowing
Olympic rowers of Canada
Olympic silver medalists for Canada
Oxford University Boat Club rowers
Rowers at the 2004 Summer Olympics
Rowers at the 2008 Summer Olympics
Rowers at the 2012 Summer Olympics
Sportspeople from Kelowna
University of California, Berkeley alumni